Juan Ferrer Lahera (24 August 1955 – 22 October 2015) was a Cuban former judoka who competed in the 1980 Summer Olympics. He helped to train some of the great Cuban judokas such as Ernesto R Cortes,  a silver and gold medallist in the Central and Panamerican games .

References

1955 births
2015 deaths
Olympic judoka of Cuba
Judoka at the 1980 Summer Olympics
Olympic silver medalists for Cuba
Olympic medalists in judo
Cuban male judoka
Medalists at the 1980 Summer Olympics
Pan American Games medalists in judo
Pan American Games silver medalists for Cuba
Pan American Games bronze medalists for Cuba
Judoka at the 1979 Pan American Games
Judoka at the 1983 Pan American Games
Medalists at the 1979 Pan American Games
Medalists at the 1983 Pan American Games
20th-century Cuban people
21st-century Cuban people